Belvue is a city in Pottawatomie County, Kansas, United States.  As of the 2020 census, the population of the city was 177.

History
Belvue was laid out in 1871. The first post office in Belvue was established in May 1871.

Geography
Belvue is located at  (39.216225, -96.178480).

Demographics

Belvue is part of the Manhattan, Kansas Metropolitan Statistical Area.

2010 census
As of the census of 2010, there were 205 people, 68 households, and 53 families residing in the city. The racial makeup of the city was 97.6% White and 2.4% from two or more races. Hispanic or Latino of any race were 6.8% of the population.

There were 68 households, of which 36.8% had children under the age of 18 living with them, 58.8% were married couples living together, 13.2% had a female householder with no husband present, 5.9% had a male householder with no wife present, and 22.1% were non-families. 17.6% of all households were made up of individuals, and 14.7% had someone living alone who was 65 years of age or older. The average household size was 3.01 and the average family size was 3.49.

The median age in the city was 30.5 years. 33.7% of residents were under the age of 18; 9.2% were between the ages of 18 and 24; 21.5% were from 25 to 44; 25.3% were from 45 to 64; and 10.2% were 65 years of age or older. The gender makeup of the city was 47.8% male and 52.2% female.

2000 census
As of the census of 2000, there were 228 people, 75 households, and 54 families residing in the city. The racial makeup of the city was 98.68% White, 0.44% Native American, and 0.88% from two or more races.

There were 75 households, out of which 37.3% had children under the age of 18 living with them, 65.3% were married couples living together, 4.0% had a female householder with no husband present, and 28.0% were non-families. 26.7% of all households were made up of individuals, and 13.3% had someone living alone who was 65 years of age or older. The average household size was 3.04 and the average family size was 3.69.

In the city, the population was spread out, with 36.4% under the age of 18, 9.2% from 18 to 24, 26.8% from 25 to 44, 13.2% from 45 to 64, and 14.5% who were 65 years of age or older. The median age was 29 years. For every 100 females, there were 100.0 males. For every 100 females age 18 and over, there were 123.1 males.

The median income for a household in the city was $35,625, and the median income for a family was $34,500. Males had a median income of $27,222 versus $22,813 for females. The per capita income for the city was $12,200. About 10.7% of families and 20.7% of the population were below the poverty line, including 38.3% of those under the age of eighteen and none of those 65 or over.

Education
The community is served by Wamego USD 320 public school district.

References

Further reading

External links
 City of Belvue
 Belvue - Directory of Public Officials
 Belvue city map, KDOT

Cities in Kansas
Cities in Pottawatomie County, Kansas
Manhattan, Kansas metropolitan area